Punta de Mata is the municipal capital of the municipality of Ezequiel Zamora in the state of Monagas in Venezuela.

Notes and references  

Populated places in Venezuela
Cities in Monagas